This is a list of association football clubs located in Nigeria.
For a complete list see :Category:Football clubs in Nigeria

A
Abia Comets
Abia Warriors F.C.
Abiola Babes
ABS F.C.
Abuja F.C.
ACB Lagos
Adamawa United F.C.
Akpor United F.C.
Akwa Starlets FC
Akwa United F.C.
Anambra Pillars F.C.
Anambra United F.C.
Apa United FC

B
Babanawa F.C.
Bayelsa United F.C.
BCC Lions
Bendel Insurance F.C.
Bridge Boys F.C.
Bussdor United F.C.

C
C.O.D United football club of Lagos
Calabar Rovers
Collins Edwin F.C.
Crown F.C.
Cynosure FC of Ebonyi state

D
Dalhatu United
DSS FC
DaltaForce fc

E
El-Kanemi Warriors
Enugu Rangers
Enyimba International F.C.
Esan F.C.
First Bank F.C.
Fountain FC

G
Gateway United F.C.
Giwa FC
Go Round F.C.
Gombe United F.C.
Gbagada Fc

H
Heartland F.C.

I
Ifeanyi Ubah F.C
Ikorodu United F.C.
Ilesa Dynamos F.C.
FC Inter Enugu
Ikorodu City Fc

J
Jasper United
Jigawa Golden Stars F.C.
JUTH F.C.

K
Kada City F.C.
Kaduna United F.C.
Kano Pillars F.C.
Kogi United
Kwara United F.C.
Knights F.C. Ife

L
Leventis United
Lobi Stars F.C.

M
MFM FC
Mighty Jets F.C.
My People FC
Milars Football Club

N
NAF Rockets F.C.
Nasarawa United F.C.
Nembe City F.C.
NEPA Lagos
New Nigeria Bank F.C.
Niger Tornadoes F.C.
NITEL Vasco Da Gama F.C.

O
Oasis Football Club
Ocean Boys F.C.
Owazi F.C
Obio Akpor Football Club

P
Plateau United F.C.
Prime F.C.

R
Racca Rovers
Ranchers Bees FC
Remo FC
Rising Stars F.C.
Rivers United F.C.

S
Sharks F.C.
Shooting Stars SC
Sokoto United
Spotlight F.C.
Star Base Football Club
Stationery Stores F.C.
Sunshine Stars F.C.
Sunsel F.C.
Super 11 F.C.
Sporting Lagos FC

T
Taraba F.C.
TEAP FC

U
Udoji United F.C.
Union Bank F.C.

V 
Vandrezzer F.C.

W
Warri Wolves F.C.
Westside F.C.
Wikki Tourists F.C.
Wolonso United F.C.

Y
Yankari Babes FC

Z
Zabgai Fc of bauchi
Zamfara United F.C.

References

Nigeria
 
Football clubs
Football clubs